Tenacibaculum xiamenense is a Gram-negative and aerobic bacterium from the genus of Tenacibaculum which has been isolated from seawater from Xiamen in China.

References

External links
Type strain of Tenacibaculum xiamenense at BacDive -  the Bacterial Diversity Metadatabase

Flavobacteria
Bacteria described in 2013